Stephen Keel (born April 11, 1983 in Littleton, Colorado) is a former American soccer player who most recently played for FC Dallas in Major League Soccer.

Career

College and amateur
Keel played college soccer at Wake Forest University from 2001 to 2004 where he appeared in 63 games scoring 13 goals and adding 9 assists. During his college career he also played with Bradenton Academics in the USL Premier Development League.

Professional
On July 11, 2005 Keel signed a developmental contract with the Colorado Rapids. During the 2006 season Keel spent time on loan with the Seattle Sounders of the USL First Division, scoring 1 goal in 10 games for the team. While with Colorado Keel appeared in 36 games with the Rapids reserves, leading the reserve team to back-to-back MLS Reserve Division championships in 2006 and 2007 and was named MLS Magazine's Reserve Player of the Year following the 2007 season. 

He was waived by the Rapids on March 13, 2009, and subsequently signed for the Portland Timbers on March 16, 2009. In his first season with Portland Keel appeared in 29 league matches scoring 1 goal in helping the club capture the USL First Division Commissioner's Cup as regular season champions. In his second season with Portland Keel remained a fixture in the Timber defense and helped the club reach the playoffs. On May 29, 2010 Keel scored Portland's second goal in a 3-2 come from behind victory over Argentina's  Boca Juniors in a friendly played at PGE Park.

On March 9, 2011 Keel joined New York Red Bulls after a trial stint. On March 26, 2011 Keel made his official debut for New York playing the full 90 in a 0-0 draw against Columbus Crew. By the end of the season Keel became a regular starter for New York and helped the club qualify for the MLS playoffs.

On November 19, 2012, New York announced it declined options for ten players including Keel. Keel chose to enter the 2012 MLS Re-Entry Draft held in December 2012. He was selected by FC Dallas in stage two of the re-entry draft and signed with the club on January 9, 2013. He scored his first goal on October 26, 2013 in a 2-1 away loss to the San Jose Earthquakes in the 90th minute. His goal was a header and was assisted by Blas Perez.
 During a 2014 Lamar Hunt U.S. Open Cup semifinal game against the Philadelphia Union, he suffered a foot injury that caused him to miss the rest of the MLS season. He also spent much of 2015 rehabbing the injury and did not appear in any first team games.

Keel became a free agent after the 2015 season and was not re-signed by FC Dallas.

Honors

Portland Timbers
USL First Division Commissioner's Cup (1): 2009

References

External links
 
 Wake Forest Demon Deacons bio

1983 births
Living people
American soccer players
Wake Forest Demon Deacons men's soccer players
IMG Academy Bradenton players
Colorado Rapids players
Seattle Sounders (1994–2008) players
Portland Timbers (2001–2010) players
New York Red Bulls players
FC Dallas players
USL League Two players
Major League Soccer players
USL First Division players
USSF Division 2 Professional League players
Soccer players from Colorado
Association football defenders